Novopetrivka, formerly known as Dar-Oleksandrivka is a village in Bashtanka Raion of Mykolaiv Oblast (region). It belongs to Shyroke rural hromada, one of the hromadas of Ukraine.

Geography 
On the southern outskirts of the village, the Krynychna Chebanka river flows into the Verevchyna river.

History 
As of 1886, 280 people lived in the village. It was formerly part of the Kherson governorate and there were 51 yard farms, and there were 2 benches.

Until 18 July 2020, Novopetrivka belonged to Snihurivka Raion. The raion was abolished that day as part of the administrative reform of Ukraine, which reduced the number of raions of Mykolaiv Oblast to four. The area of Snihurivka Raion was merged into Bashtanka Raion.

2022 Russian Invasion of Ukraine 

During the 2022 Russian Invasion of Ukraine, Russia entered Mykolaiv Oblast and captured several towns, including Novopetrivka.

References 

Villages in Bashtanka Raion